Rabbi Saadiah ben Maimon ben Moshe ibn Danan (born 2nd half of 15th century in Granada, Spain – died 1493(?) in Oran, Algeria) was a grammarian of Hebrew and Arabic, poet and a halachic authority. He served as a dayan in Granada, and after the expulsion of Jews from Spain settled in Oran. Among his works are rabbinic Responsa, a Talmudic dictionary called Sepher Arukh, works on Hebrew grammar and Hebrew verse, as well as a Hebrew dictionary written in Arabic. He was the first writer to compare Hebrew metre with its Arabic counterpart.

References
Ibn Danan, Saadia. Ad-Daruri fi-l-Lughah-al-'Ibraniyyah / Sepher ha-Shorashim (Granada: Universidad de Granada, 1996).
Ibn Danan, Saadia. Seder ha-dorot (Madrid: Aben Ezra Ediciones, 1997).  
"Even Danan, Sa'adyah ben Maimon", Article in Encyclopaedia Hebraica
"Ibn Dannan, Saadiah ben Maimun", Article in Encyclopaedia Judaica

Medieval Hebraists
15th-century Castilian rabbis
15th-century births
1493 deaths
Year of birth unknown
Year of death uncertain
Jews expelled from Spain in 1492
Clergy from Granada
Exponents of Jewish law
Judeo-Arabic writers
15th-century Algerian rabbis